My Seven Little Sins, released in UK as I Had Seven Daughters, is a 1954 French-Italian comedy film co-written and directed by Jean Boyer and starring Maurice Chevalier  and Delia Scala. It is based on a comedy play of Aldo De Benedetti, previously adapted by  	Nunzio Malasomma in the film We Were Seven Sisters.

Plot

Cast 

Maurice Chevalier as  Count  André de Courvallon 
 Delia Scala as  Luisella
 Colette Ripert  as  Linda
 Maria Frau as  Lolita
  Annick Tanguy as  Nadine
 Luciana Paluzzi  as  Pat
 Maria-Luisa Da Silva as  Blachette
 Gaby Basset  as  Maria
 Paolo Stoppa  as  Antonio 
  Fred Pasquali as  Professor Gorbiggi

References

External links

1954 films
1954 comedy films
French comedy films
Italian comedy films
Films directed by Jean Boyer
1950s French-language films
1950s French films
1950s Italian films